Vedskalen Ridge is a prominent rock and ice ridge on the northwest side of Mount Hochlin, in the Muhlig-Hofmann Mountains of Queen Maud Land. It was mapped by Norwegian cartographers from surveys and air photos by the Norwegian Antarctic Expedition (1956–60) and named Vedskalen (the wooden shed).

Ridges of Queen Maud Land
Princess Martha Coast